Christina Schwanitz (born 24 December 1985) is a retired German shot putter. Her personal best is 20.77 metres, achieved on 20 May 2015 at World Challenge meeting in Beijing. She has 20.05 m on the indoor track, achieved on 2 February 2014 in Rochlitz.

Achievements

References

External links

 
 
 
 
 
 
 
 

1985 births
Living people
Athletes from Dresden
German female shot putters
German national athletics champions
Athletes (track and field) at the 2008 Summer Olympics
Athletes (track and field) at the 2012 Summer Olympics
Athletes (track and field) at the 2016 Summer Olympics
Olympic athletes of Germany
World Athletics Championships athletes for Germany
World Athletics Championships medalists
European Athletics Championships medalists
Diamond League winners
IAAF Continental Cup winners
World Athletics Championships winners
Athletes (track and field) at the 2020 Summer Olympics